The Cooper Motor Corporation, also known as CMC Motors Group Limited, is the fifth-largest importer of vehicles and fifth-largest car-assembly company in Kenya, the largest economy in the East African Community.

Location
The company headquarters are located between Lusaka Road and Bunyala Road in the Industrial Area of Nairobi, the capital of Kenya and the largest city in that country.  The manufacturing unit and vehicle assembly plants are on Bunyala Road, while the showrooms are on Lusaka Road. Workshop Road connects the two locations. The coordinates of the company headquarters are:1°17'57.0"S, 36°49'39.0"E (Latitude:-1.299167; Longitude:36.827500).

History
CMC was founded in 1912 by Clement Hirtzel under the name Nairobi Motor Garage, in Nairobi the capital of what was at that time known as British East Africa. The company started its activities with the importation of the Ford Model T. Nairobi Motor Garage was the first company that distributed vehicles in British East Africa, which today is known as the Republic of Kenya. With the initial sales of the Ford Model T, NMG took up 52% market share of automobile sales in Kenya at that time.

In July 1948, the company was bought by one Mr. Allen and another Mr. Cooper, who had relocated from the United Kingdom to Nairobi. The company's name was changed to Cooper Motor Corporation Private Limited, to reflect the new ownership. New products were introduced including the Land Rover, which was a success in a lot of African markets. Over the decades, the company has developed into a major importer for several different brands. CMC has maintained a relationship with Ford Motor Company and have sold a variety of pick-up trucks and van models from the American vehicle manufacturer.

Over the years, the company introduced other brands like Volkswagen, Mazda, Škoda, Maruti, Suzuki, Iveco, Nissan Diesel, Bobcat, Liebherr, Case CE, Case IH, New Holland into the market.

CMC's CKD assembling of cars began in 1974 with the new Volkswagen Golf. It was followed by the Volkswagen Santana and by the models Volkswagen Jetta and Volkswagen Transporter in the mid-nineties.

For the Mazda brand, the 323, 626 and Rustler were assembled in Kenya. Currently the CMC is only assembling the truck model T3500 and the BT-50 for Mazda.

CMC next introduced the Maruti brand to the Kenyan market with the small car Maruti 800 and the SUV Maruti Gypsy King. The Maruti range was completed with the Maruti Omni some years later. The latest product is the Maruti Suzuki Swift which is only imported and not official distributed through CMC.

In the 1990s the CMC introduced the Suzuki brand to the East African market with the Suzuki Vitara and the Suzuki Alto. Later the Vitara was replaced by the Suzuki Grand Vitara and the model range was completed with the Suzuki Jimny and Suzuki SX4.

The most recently introduced brand was in 2004 with Škoda and their small car Škoda Fabia, followed by the sedan version, which is assembled as the Škoda Octavia for the East African market.

For the Ford partnership, the CMC had assembled the Ford Escort, the Ford Telstar and the Ford Laser. Currently assembled models are the Ford F-250 (2004 version), the Ford Ranger THA (2004 version), Ford Focus C307 and the Ford Territory (SX model).

Assembled vehicles
Iveco AT720 Prime Mover
Iveco Euro-Trakker
Iveco MP380
Nissan Diesel CB31 Bus (62 seats)
Nissan Diesel CB46 Bus (67 seats)
Nissan Diesel CWB450 Truck
Nissan Diesel MKB210 Bus (62 seats)
Nissan Diesel MKB210 Truck
Nissan Diesel NU41 Bus (29 seats, also known as Swara)
Nissan Diesel NU41 Truck (also known as Swara)
Nissan Diesel PKF210 Truck
Mazda T3500 
Mazda BT-50
Škoda Fabia
Ford F-250 (2004 version) 
Ford Ranger THA (2004 version) 
Ford Focus C307 
Ford Territory (SX model)
Ford Mustang (GT, EcoBoost)

Corporate structure
, the holding company whose shares were previously listed on the Nairobi Securities Exchange is known as CMC Holdings Limited. The subsidiaries owned by the holding company include the following:

 CMC Motors Group – Nairobi, Kenya
 CMC Motors Finance – Nairobi, Kenya
 Cooper Motors Corporation – Kampala, Uganda 
 Hughes Motors Limited – Dar es Salaam, Tanzania
 Hughes Agriculture Limited – Dar es Salaam, Tanzania

Ownership
CMC Holdings Limited and all its subsidiaries in Kenya, Uganda and Tanzania are wholly owned by the Al-Futtaim Group, based in the United Arab Emirates.

References

External links
Official website of the CMC Motors Group Limited
Delisting Leaves 46 Holdouts Clinging To Private CMC Shares

Car manufacturers of Kenya
Bus manufacturers of Kenya
Truck manufacturers of Kenya
Vehicle manufacturing companies established in 1912
1912 establishments in Kenya
Kenyan brands
Manufacturing companies based in Nairobi
Motor vehicle manufacturers of Uganda
Companies formerly listed on the Nairobi Securities Exchange